Sir Gilbert Lawrence Chandler KBE, CMG (29 August 1903 – 8 April 1974) was a Liberal Party politician who served in the Bolte Ministry in Victoria.

Chandler, a horticulturist, was educated at Scotch College in Melbourne. As a 25-year-old, Chandler played a game for the Hawthorn Football Club in the 1928 VFL season. He became a partner in his family's nursery at The Basin in Bayswater before following his father, Alfred, into politics.

When Alfred Chandler died in 1935, Gilbert won the subsequent by-election and took his place as the United Australia Party representative for Southern Province in the Victorian Legislative Council. In 1935, Chandler also joined the Fern Tree Gully Shire Council, and served as its president in 1938 and 1939. He switched to the Liberal Party in 1943.

He was minister without portfolio from 1943 to 1945 and as the chairman of the Bush Fire Relief committee from 1944 until 1946. When Henry Bolte became premier in 1955, he wanted Chandler as the Education Minister, but due to Chandler's horticultural background, Chandler requested to be Minister of Agriculture. The son-in-law of former politician Jabez Coon, he served in that position until he retired from parliament in 1973.

Chandler was the Minister of State Development, Decentralisation and Immigration briefly in 1956. In 1962, he was appointed as the leader of the Legislative Council, having been deputy-leader since 1955. Due to his sporting history, Chandler was a member of the 1956 Summer Olympics organising committee. He later served as chairman of the Melbourne Cricket Ground in 1973 and 1974.
 
He died of a coronary occlusion in 1974, at the William Angliss Hospital, which he had been co-founder and president of since 1939. An agricultural college called the Gilbert Chandler Institute of Dairy Technology at Werribee was named after him.

References

|-

|-

1903 births
1974 deaths
Australian horticulturists
United Australia Party members of the Parliament of Victoria
Liberal Party of Australia members of the Parliament of Victoria
Members of the Victorian Legislative Council
Australian rules footballers from Melbourne
Hawthorn Football Club players
Australian sportsperson-politicians
Australian Knights Commander of the Order of the British Empire
Australian Companions of the Order of St Michael and St George
Australian politicians awarded knighthoods
20th-century Australian botanists
20th-century Australian politicians
People from North Melbourne
People from Boronia, Victoria
People educated at Scotch College, Melbourne
Victorian Ministers for Agriculture